Richard Kawakami (February 22, 1931 – March 8, 1987) was an American businessman and politician.

Born in Waimea, Kauai County, Hawaii, Kawakami received his bachelor's degree from University of Hawaii and his master's degree from New York University. Kawakami was the president of the Big Save Groceries in Kauai County. Kawakami served on the Kauai County Council and was a Democrat. Kawakami served in the Hawaii House of Representatives from 1968 until his death in 1987. He served as speaker of the house in 1987 at the time of his death. Kawakami died suddenly of a heart attack while on a hunting trip on Lanai. His wife Bertha succeeded his husband in the Hawaii Legislature.

Notes 

1931 births
1987 deaths
People from Kauai County, Hawaii
University of Hawaiʻi alumni
New York University alumni
Businesspeople from Hawaii
Kauai County Council members
Democratic Party members of the Hawaii House of Representatives
Hawaii politicians of Japanese descent
American people of Japanese descent
20th-century American politicians
20th-century American businesspeople